The Private Life of a Cat is a 1947 black and white experimental documentary film by Alexander Hammid and Maya Deren. Archive.org summarizes the film as an "intimate study" of a female cat who gives birth to a litter of kittens and shows their maturation.

Synopsis

The film is entirely silent and shot from the cat's eye-level; "He", an all white short-haired male cat, grooms "She", a fluffier female. After two months they find a spot "for the family", and soon after the mother goes into labour. The film shows graphically the kittens being born without the help of human hands, and then getting nursed and washed by their mother. The kittens grow, and the parent cats roam freely around their owners' apartment (Hammid and Deren). The kittens learn how to walk and begin to get more active, playing with each other and clawing various furniture. The film then ends by showing the same scene from the beginning where "He" courts "She".

Reputation
Top Documentary Films rates The Private Life of a Cat 7.70/10 stars, saying that it is "very touching", and that it is "[b]eautifully photographed and executed. With subtitles, no dialog, and a refreshing absence of human beings on screen." Dangerous Minds wrote "[t]his beautiful 1944 silent film from husband-and-wife team Maya Deren and Alexander Hammid is quite possibly the only evidence we need that cats are the ultimate well-spring of creativity."

References

External links

Films directed by Alexandr Hackenschmied
1940s avant-garde and experimental films
1947 films
Films directed by Maya Deren
American black-and-white films
1947 documentary films
American documentary films
1940s American films